The Krems is a river in Waldviertel in northern Lower Austria. There are actually two rivers: the so-called "Große Krems" (Greater Krems), denoting either the whole river system or the main tributary only, and the smaller one called "Kleine Krems" (Lesser Krems).

The Krems is the backbone of the wine region of Kremstal, it passes Senftenberg and the ruins of Lengenfeld, and after emerging from the granite and gneiss plateau (part of the Bohemian Massif), it flows through the Tulln Basin near Krems.

Beneath the castle Burg Hartenstein, at the confluence of the headstreams, is the Gudenus cave by the riverbank, which was inhabited in the Stone Age.

See also
Krems (Upper Austria)

References

External links

Rivers of Lower Austria
Rivers of Austria